Ana Mena Rojas (born 25 February 1997) is a Spanish singer and actress. She began her career in 2009 in the TV series Marisol, la película (2009). In 2010, she participated in Disney's musical reality show My Camp Rock 2, ending up as the winner.

Her musical career began in 2016, when she released her debut single "No Soy Como Tú Crees". Mena has also collaborated with many international artists. In 2018, she gained popularity in Italy with the song D'estate non Vale with Fred De Palma. The unexpected Italian success was a game changer in her career. Since then, she managed to deliver several summer hit songs both in Italy and Spain, becoming one of the most listened Spanish artists of the streaming era.

According to her record label, as of 2023, she was credited for sales equivalent to 1 Diamond cetification in France, besides 44 Platinum and 3 Gold certifications in between Italy and Spain.

Career 
Two of Ana Mena's recent singles, "" and "", are covers of Italian pop songs: "" by Colapesce and Dimartino and "" by Ernia, respectively.

Mena plans on releasing her second studio album, Bellodrama, on the 24th of March, 2023.

Filmography

Discography

Studio album

Singles

As lead artist

As featured artist

Promotional singles

Notes:

Guest appearances

References

External links 
 
 
 

Spanish women pop singers
1997 births
People from Estepona
21st-century Spanish singers
21st-century Spanish actresses
Spanish television actresses
Spanish film actresses
Living people
Sony Music Spain artists
21st-century Spanish women singers